Kasese Airport  is an airstrip serving the village of Kasese in Maniema Province, Democratic Republic of the Congo.

See also

Transport in the Democratic Republic of the Congo
List of airports in the Democratic Republic of the Congo

References

External links
 OurAirports - Kasese
 Kasese Airport
 Great Circle Mapper - Kasese
 HERE Maps - Kasese

Airports in Maniema